Cornel Vena (20 October 1932 – 18 April 2017) was a Romanian modern pentathlete. He competed at the 1956 Summer Olympics.

In 1954, he won the first Romanian Pentathlon Championship. Vena was the first Romanian national champion in 1955. He also won the National Triathlon Competition (swimming, running, shooting). In 1956, as part of the Romanian team, he competed at the Melbourne Olympics in the Pentathlon (riding, swimming, running, shooting, fencing) and won the fencing. His fencing result has become the longest standing record in the history of the modern Olympic Games.

He won 29 of 35 bouts in fencing, scoring a total of 1,111 points. This is the best known performance in Olympic modern pentathlon fencing, winning 82.9% of his bouts, and the highest ever points score awarded in fencing in the Olympic modern pentathlon.

He became Australian Champion in 1957, and won the team epee and foil championship in 1962, dominating modern pentathlon competition between 1971 and 1979.

In 1997, the Ministry of Youth and Sports of Romania retroactively awarded Cornel Vena the title of Master of Sports. In 1997, the Ministry of Youth and Sports of Romania retroactively awarded Cornel Vena the title of Master of Sports. Vena continued to coach aspiring fencers for sixty years.

References

External links
 

1932 births
2017 deaths
Romanian male modern pentathletes
Olympic modern pentathletes of Romania
Modern pentathletes at the 1956 Summer Olympics
Sportspeople from Sibiu